The Sulaiman Mountains, also known as Kōh-e Sulaymān (Balochi/Urdu/; "Mountains of Solomon") or Da Kasē Ghrūna ("Mountains of Kasi"), are a north–south extension of the southern Hindu Kush mountain system in Pakistan and Afghanistan. They rise to form the eastern edge of the Iranian plateau. They are located in the Kandahar, Zabul, Paktika and Paktia provinces of Afghanistan, and in Pakistan they extend over the northern part of Balochistan and some southern parts of Khyber Pakhtunkhwa. In southwestern Punjab, the mountains extend into the two districts of Dera Ghazi Khan and Rajanpur, which are located west of the Indus River on the boundary with Balochistan. Together with the Kirthar Mountains on the border between Balochistan and Sindh, the Sulaiman Mountains form what is known as the Sulaiman-Kirthar geologic province.

The highest peak, however, is Zarghun Ghar at  near Quetta, Pakistan.

Geography
The eastern edge of the Sulaiman range runs  from the Gomal Pass in Pakistan's Khyber Pakhtunkhwa province to near the city of Jacobabad in Sindh province, and further stretches into south-west Punjab.

In Afghanistan, the western edge of the range starts just beyond the northern Loya Paktia province where they meet the Koh-i-Baba range. South from there, they meet the Spin Ghar range northeast of Gardez in Paktia province, but towards west, the mountain range drops gradually in Kandahar southwest into Helmand and the Sistan Basin.

The Sulaiman Range, and the high plateaus to the west of it, helps form a natural barrier against the humid winds that blow from the Indian Ocean, creating arid conditions across southern and central Afghanistan to the west and north. In contrast, the relatively flat and low-lying Indus delta is situated due east and south of the Sulaimans. 

Rivers that drain the Sulaimans include the Gomal River which flows eastward into the Indus River, and the Dori River and other small tributaries of the Arghandab River, which flow southwestward into the Helmand River.

Geology 
The Sulaimans were formed as a fold and thrust belt as the Indian Plate collided into Eurasian Plate beginning about 30 million years ago. The Indian Plate's counter-clockwise rotation as it collided with the Eurasian Plate resulted in the Sulaiman's having some of the most complex tectonic structures in the world, including "stacking" of thrust faults. The complex fault-system is capable of producing doublet earthquakes that jump to other faults - such as the 1997 Harnai earthquake in which a magnitude 7.1 earthquake triggered a 6.8 earthquake 19 seconds later on a second fault 50 kilometres away.

Areas in the southern part of the range include an Imbricate fan of slices of rocks in close parallel, bounded by faults on either side of each slice. Along the Eastern edge of the Sulaimans is the Sulaiman Fold, an area within the Indian Plate consisting of sediment, alongside which runs the Ornach Nal-Ghazaband-Chaman Fault.

Legends about Takht-e-Sulaiman 

In Pashtun legend, it is associated with Prophet Solomon. According to the legend, Prophet Solomon climbed this mountain and looked out over the land of South Asia, which was then covered with darkness, and so turned back without descending into this new frontier, and left only the mountain which is named after him (as told by Ibn Battuta). 

According to another legend, Noah's Ark alighted in the Takht-i Sulaiman after the Deluge.

Another legend says that Qais Abdur Rashid, said to be the legendary ancestor of the Pashtun nation, is buried atop Takht-e-Sulaiman, and so it is also locally known as Da Kasī Ghar (د کسي غر, "Mount of Qais"). 

According to this legend, his descendants migrated west, north, and south from here. Some people visit the place and make animal sacrifices, usually a sheep or a goat, at the tomb of Qais to help feed the poor. Trips to the mountain is undertaken mostly in summer, since from late November until March the snowfall makes it difficult to climb.

See also
 Loe Nekan
 Wadani
 Spin Ghar
 Hindu Kush
 List of mountain ranges of the world
 Fort Munro
Sheikh Badin

References

External links
NASA Earth Observatory page
Chiltan Adventures Association Balochistan

 
Mountain ranges of Afghanistan
Mountain ranges of Balochistan (Pakistan)
Mountain ranges of Punjab (Pakistan)
Iranian Plateau
Landforms of Kandahar Province
Landforms of Zabul Province
Landforms of Khost Province
Landforms of Paktia Province
Landforms of Paktika Province